Bina Nusantara University, also known as BINUS University, is a private university in Indonesia. The main campus of the university is located at Kebon Jeruk, West Jakarta. Most of its campuses are located within the area of Greater Jakarta Region. It also has campuses at Bandung, Malang, and Semarang.

History

Bina Nusantara University originally evolved from a computer training institute, Modern Computer Course, which was founded on 21 October 1974. Along with the development, the Modern Computer Course later developed into Computer Engineering Academy (ATK) on July 1, 1981. The academy offers informatics and informatics management education. Three years later on 13 July 1984 ATK achieved registered status and the name changed to AMIK Jakarta. On July 1, 1985, AMIK opened a course in accounting computerization. AMIK began to use the name Bina Nusantara on 21 September 1985.

AMIK was awarded the best computer academy award from the Ministry of Education and Culture on March 17, 1986. AMIK Bina Nusantara then formed STMIK (College of Informatics and Computer Management) Bina Nusantara on July 1, 1986. The institute then offered undergraduate study programs (S1) in informatics management and informatics engineering.

On November 9, 1987, AMIK Bina Nusantara joined STMIK Bina Nusantara to form an educational institution offering a diploma study program (D3) and strata 1 (S1). STMIK Bina Nusantara gained an equal status for all courses on March 18, 1992. STMIK Bina Nusantara then opened a postgraduate program of information systems management, first in Indonesia on May 10, 1993.

Bina Nusantara University was established on August 8, 1996. STMIK Bina Nusantara then joined Bina Nusantara University on December 20, 1998. Currently, Bina Nusantara University has educational programs: School of Information Systems, School of Informatics Engineering, Faculty of Engineering, School of Business and Management, Faculty of Economics and Communication, School of Design, Faculty of Humanities, Master of Informatics Engineering, Master of Information Systems Management, Master of Business Management, and Doctoral of Management Research.

On October 23, 2014, Binus University launched its new campus by holding a grand launching of Binus University in Alam Sutera, Serpong, South Tangerang.  The new campus is a 22-floor building and applies the concept of a green campus, environmentally friendly building with the use of energy-saving facilities. A campus area of 25 thousand square meters was designed by Indonesian architects, namely Budiman. The A campus has four main courses. The four are computer science, school of design, school business and management, and information systems.

On April 29, 2015, Binus and PT. Summarecon Agung Tbk. signed a new campus construction agreement at Summarecon Bekasi. The campus is planned to be built on an area of 36,400 sqm at Summarecon Bekasi City Circle Road Bulevar. For the initial phase, in March 2016 Binus will open an online learning facility: BINUS UNIVERSITY LEARNING COMMUNITY (BULC) in Summarecon City Bekasi and the next stage Binus University campus will be fully operational by 2018. Now, Binus has 9 campuses in Indonesia, with all of them located in Java. 4 are located in Jakarta, while the others are located in Malang, Semarang, Bandung, Bekasi, and Tangerang.

Courses  
Bina Nusantara University has 3 types of courses: regular, international, and online.

Regular program 
There are 3 levels of regular courses provided by Bina Nusantara University: undergraduate, master and doctorate levels.

Undergraduate level  
Bina Nusantara University offers undergraduate courses with single degree and double degree programs. The undergraduate degree has 3 faculties and 4 schools:

Faculty of Economics and Communication
Faculty of Engineering
Faculty of Humanities
School of Informatics Engineering
School of Design
School of Information Systems
School of Business and Management

Master degree  
Bina Nusantara University offers master courses with a single degree and a double degree program in which students will earn two master's degrees, one from Bina Nusantara University and one from Macquarie University.

Doctorate level  
The doctoral level has only two courses: Doctor of Computer Science (DCS) and Doctoral Research in Management (DRM).

International lecture courses  
International lecture program obtains bachelor's degree from a foreign partner university of Bina Nusantara University.

Online courses
The online college program enables students to earn a bachelor's degree by studying remotely through the internet and during the corona pandemic from March 2020, students started to learn remotely most of the semesters from outside campuses of BINUS.

Cooperation with foreign universities, institutes, and associations 
Bina Nusantara cooperates with foreign universities from all around the regions for general agreement, faculty mobility, joint degree or double degree, joint research, short or summer course, students exchange, study abroad, and other activities.

References

Universities in Jakarta
Universities in Indonesia